Wu Maoshun is a Chinese Paralympic powerlifter. He represented China at the 2004 Summer Paralympics and at the 2008 Summer Paralympics and he won two medals: the silver medal in the men's 67.5 kg event in 2004 and the bronze medal in the men's 67.5 kg event in 2008.

References

External links 
 

Living people
Year of birth missing (living people)
Place of birth missing (living people)
Powerlifters at the 2004 Summer Paralympics
Powerlifters at the 2008 Summer Paralympics
Medalists at the 2004 Summer Paralympics
Medalists at the 2008 Summer Paralympics
Paralympic silver medalists for China
Paralympic bronze medalists for China
Paralympic medalists in powerlifting
Paralympic powerlifters of China
Chinese powerlifters
21st-century Chinese people